Sénart (formerly Melun-Sénart) is a new town in southern Île-de-France, covering parts of the departments of Seine-et-Marne and Essonne.

Education 
 Institut catholique d'arts et métiers

Communes 
 Combs-la-Ville
 Réau
 Moissy-Cramayel
 Cesson
 Lieusaint
 Nandy
 Savigny-le-Temple
 Vert-Saint-Denis
 Morsang-sur-Seine
 Saint-Pierre-du-Perray
 Saintry-sur-Seine
 Tigery

 
Geography of Essonne
Geography of Seine-et-Marne
New towns in Île-de-France
New towns started in the 1960s